Ngô Lý Tín (20 January 1126 – ?) was a Vietnamese general and scholar during the Lý dynasty. A monument to him is located in the village of Cam Khe.

References

1126 births
Lý dynasty generals
Year of death unknown